The 1953 Mississippi Southern Southerners football team represented Mississippi Southern College (now known as the University of Southern Mississippi) in the 1953 college football season. The team played in the Sun Bowl against Texas Western.  The Southerners compiled a 9–2 record, and outscored their opponents 280 to 122.  They were ranked for three weeks in the AP poll, and defeated a top 5 Alabama team that won the SEC to begin the season.

Schedule

References

Mississippi Southern
Southern Miss Golden Eagles football seasons
Mississippi Southern Southerners football